Los Gatos Creek Park is a county park in Campbell, California, a town that is bisected by the Los Gatos Creek. The park is operated by the Santa Clara County Parks and Recreation Department.

Location
Vehicular access is off of Dell Avenue, just north of East Hacienda Avenue.  A parking lot is at the end of the access lane.  California State Route 17 runs just to the east of the park.

Facilities
A pavilion and picnic tables are present.  The Los Gatos Creek Trail runs through the park, north and south.  A bike and pedestrian bridge across highway 17 provides access from the east.

The Los Gatos Creek County Dog Park is located within the park.

The lake
The lake in the park is a reshaped version of a natural lake.

References

County Parks in Santa Clara County, California
Regional parks in California